In Greek mythology, Hilaera (Ancient Greek: Ἱλάειρα; also Ilaeira) was a Messenian princess.

Family 
Hilaera was a daughter of Leucippus and Philodice, daughter of Inachus. She and her sister Phoebe are commonly referred to as Leucippides (that is, "daughters of Leucippus"). In another account, they were the daughters of Apollo. Hilaera married Castor and bore him a son, named either Anogon or Anaxis.

Mythology 
Hilaera and Phoebe were priestesses of Artemis and Athena, and betrothed to Lynceus and Idas, the sons of Aphareus. Castor and Pollux were charmed by their beauty and carried them off. When Idas and Lynceus tried to rescue their brides-to-be they were both slain, but Castor himself fell. Pollux persuaded Zeus to allow him to share his immortality with his brother.

Cultural depictions 
Hilaera and Phoebe are both portrayed in the painting The Rape of the Daughters of Leucippus.

Notes

References 
Princesses in Greek mythology
Children of Apollo

 Apollodorus, The Library with an English Translation by Sir James George Frazer, F.B.A., F.R.S. in 2 Volumes, Cambridge, MA, Harvard University Press; London, William Heinemann Ltd. 1921. ISBN 0-674-99135-4. Online version at the Perseus Digital Library. Greek text available from the same website.
 Gaius Julius Hyginus, Fabulae from The Myths of Hyginus translated and edited by Mary Grant. University of Kansas Publications in Humanistic Studies. Online version at the Topos Text Project.
 Pausanias, Description of Greece with an English Translation by W.H.S. Jones, Litt.D., and H.A. Ormerod, M.A., in 4 Volumes. Cambridge, MA, Harvard University Press; London, William Heinemann Ltd. 1918. . Online version at the Perseus Digital Library
 Pausanias, Graeciae Descriptio. 3 vols. Leipzig, Teubner. 1903.  Greek text available at the Perseus Digital Library.
 Publius Ovidius Naso, Fasti translated by James G. Frazer. Online version at the Topos Text Project.
 Publius Ovidius Naso, Fasti. Sir James George Frazer. London; Cambridge, MA. William Heinemann Ltd.; Harvard University Press. 1933. Latin text available at the Perseus Digital Library.
Sextus Propertius, Elegies from Charm. Vincent Katz. trans. Los Angeles. Sun & Moon Press. 1995. Online version at the Perseus Digital Library. Latin text available at the same website.
 Theocritus, Idylls from The Greek Bucolic Poets translated by Edmonds, J M. Loeb Classical Library Volume 28. Cambridge, MA. Harvard Univserity Press. 1912. Online version at theoi.com
 Theocritus, Idylls edited by R. J. Cholmeley, M.A. London. George Bell & Sons. 1901. Greek text available at the Perseus Digital Library.

External links

Demigods in classical mythology
Mythological rape victims

Messenian characters in Greek mythology
Messenian mythology